"California Waiting" is the fourth single taken from the Youth & Young Manhood album by the American rock band Kings of Leon. An alternate version of the song appears on their debut release, the EP Holy Roller Novocaine. This version was recorded in a rush to finish the record. The band did not like the outcome, so they recorded a new version, which is found on Youth and Young Manhood. However, on Kings of Leon's VH1 Storytellers performance, Caleb Followill stated, before playing "California Waiting", that "We kind of sabotaged it on our album, and tried to play it really punk rock. It was better on the EP I think."

Track listing

CD single
 "California Waiting" – 3:26
 "Joe's Head" (Live at Rock in Rio) – 3:37

10" vinyl
Released on clear vinyl in a limited edition of 5,000 copies.

"California Waiting"
"Joe's Head" (Live from the Brixton Academy)

Charts

References

Kings of Leon songs
2004 singles
2003 songs
Songs written by Nathan Followill
Songs written by Caleb Followill
Songs written by Angelo Petraglia